Chibchea is a genus of South American cellar spiders that was first described by B. A. Huber in 2000.

Species
 it contains 21 species, found only in South America:
Chibchea aberrans (Chamberlin, 1916) – Peru
Chibchea abiseo Huber, 2000 – Peru
Chibchea amapa Huber & Carvalho, 2019 – Brazil
Chibchea araona Huber, 2000 – Bolivia, Chile
Chibchea danielae Huber, 2020 – Venezuela
Chibchea elqui Huber, 2000 – Chile
Chibchea hamadae Huber & Carvalho, 2019 – Brazil
Chibchea ika Huber, 2000 (type) – Colombia
Chibchea malkini Huber, 2000 – Bolivia
Chibchea mapuche Huber, 2000 – Chile, Juan Fernandez Is.
Chibchea mateo Huber, 2000 – Peru
Chibchea mayna Huber, 2000 – Ecuador, Peru
Chibchea merida Huber, 2000 – Venezuela
Chibchea picunche Huber, 2000 – Chile
Chibchea salta Huber, 2000 – Argentina
Chibchea santosi Huber & Carvalho, 2019 – Brazil
Chibchea silvae Huber, 2000 – Peru
Chibchea thunbergae Huber, 2020 – Venezuela
Chibchea tunebo Huber, 2000 – Venezuela
Chibchea uru Huber, 2000 – Peru
Chibchea valle Huber, 2000 – Colombia

See also
 List of Pholcidae species

References

Araneomorphae genera
Pholcidae
Spiders of South America